John Walley (died 1615) was an English politician.

Family
Walley was the son of William Walley, who was Mayor of Bath in 1573 and 1582. His nephew, John Walley, was a later mayor. William Shareston, MP and Mayor, was described in Walley's will as his 'brother', presumably his brother-in-law.

Career
He was a Member (MP) of the Parliament of England for Bath in 1589. He was Mayor of Bath in 1585 and 1586.

References

16th-century births
1615 deaths
Mayors of Bath, Somerset
English MPs 1589